Willie White Smith (1907 – August 29, 1989) was an American physiologist specialized in radiobiology. She researched the effects of radiation on bone marrow and the production of white blood cells at the National Institutes of Health.

Education 
Smith was born in 1907, in Thomson, Georgia. She had 4 brothers and 3 sisters. She graduated from Agnes Scott College in 1927. She earned a Ph.D. from Columbia University in 1938. Her dissertation was titled Contracture in the Gastrocnemius of the Frog. Frank H. Pike was Smith's doctoral advisor and electrophysiologist Horatio Burt Williams provided departmental support.

Career and research 
Smith began her career at NIH in 1943, in a laboratory that eventually became a part of the National Institute of Arthritis and Metabolic Diseases. Her first research projects concerned the acute toxicity of DDT, soon to be used by American troops in Italy and North Africa, and of methyl chloride—a substitute refrigerant and ingredient in synthetic rubber. Later, Smith guided a young radiologist through some experimental work, after which she began her radiobiology studies of the effects of radiation. The young radiologist— Robert Q. Marston—went on to become the Director of NIH from 1968 to 1973. In those early days of investigating the damaging effects of radiation, Smith studied the influence of environmental factors (altitude, temperature, hypoxia, exercise), endocrine factors and dietary factors on the effects of radiation and recovery from sublethal doses. She went on to study the role of infection in death from radiation, and the effects of antibiotics and the body's own cellular defenses in countering radiation. In the early 1950's she was invited to witness an atomic bomb test in Nevada and examine the blast area. The test was set up to simulate an A-bomb explosion in a residential area. In 1953 Smith and her colleagues were transferred to the laboratory of biophysics (later to become the laboratory of physiology) in the National Cancer Institute (NCI) where she continued her studies of the effects of radiation on bone marrow and the production of white blood cells.

Smith published in numerous journals, reviewed manuscripts for Radiation Research, JNCI, and Science, and served on numerous professional committees. She retired in 1977.

Personal life 
In 1941, Smith lived in Wilmington, Delaware. She was an avid gardener. In keeping with this hobby, she was presented with a hybrid rhododendron upon her retirement. In the latter part of her life, White lived in Baltimore and Chevy Chase.   She died of pneumonia on August 29, 1989.

Selected works

References 

American physiologists
Women physiologists
Radiation health effects researchers
Women radiobiologists
Radiobiologists
Women medical researchers
Scientists from Georgia (U.S. state)
Columbia University alumni
National Institutes of Health people
People from Thomson, Georgia
American medical researchers
Agnes Scott College alumni
20th-century American women scientists
20th-century American biologists
American women biologists
1907 births

1989 deaths